Judge Welsh may refer to:

George Austin Welsh (1878–1970), judge of the United States District Court for the Eastern District of Pennsylvania
Martin Ignatius Welsh (1882–1953), judge of the United States District Court for the Northern District of California